is a Japanese football player. She plays for MyNavi Sendai Ladies and Japan national team.

Club career
Nakajima was born in Yasu on September 27, 1990. After graduating from high school, she joined INAC Kobe Leonessa in 2009. The club won L.League championship for 3 years in a row (2011-2013). She was also selected Best Eleven in 2013 and 2017.

National team career
Nakajima was included in Norio Sasaki's Japan U20 national team for the 2010 U20 World Cup in Germany. She appeared in all of Japan's three matches against Mexico, Nigeria and England, scoring one goal in a 3–1 win against England, as Japan were eliminated in the group stage. Nakajima received her first cap for the senior team against United States on May 14, 2011. On July 10, 2013, she was called up to the 2013 East Asian Cup in South Korea. She scored her first goal on July 20 in a 2–0 win against China in the first East Asian Cup final round match. In 2014, she played at 2014 Asian Cup and 2014 Asian Games. Japan won the championship at Asian Cup and 2nd place at Asian Games. In 2018, she played at 2018 Asian Cup and Japan won their second consecutive title.

Club statistics

National team statistics

National team goals

Under–20
Scores and results list Japan U20's goal tally first.

Senior team
Scores and results list Japan's goal tally first.

Honours

Club
INAC Kobe Leonessa
L.League (2): 2011, 2012
Empress's Cup (3): 2010, 2011, 2012
Japan and South Korea Women's League Championship (1): 2012

References

External links
 
 

Japan Football Association
 Emi Nakajima profile at INAC Kobe Leonessa
 Emi Nakajima profile at MyNavi Sendai Ladies

1990 births
Living people
Association football people from Shiga Prefecture
Japanese women's footballers
Japan women's international footballers
Women's association football midfielders
Nadeshiko League players
WE League players
INAC Kobe Leonessa players
Mynavi Vegalta Sendai Ladies players
Footballers at the 2014 Asian Games
Footballers at the 2018 Asian Games
Asian Games gold medalists for Japan
Asian Games silver medalists for Japan
Asian Games medalists in football
Medalists at the 2014 Asian Games
Medalists at the 2018 Asian Games
2019 FIFA Women's World Cup players
Footballers at the 2020 Summer Olympics
Olympic footballers of Japan